Bojan Mlađović (born 16 October 1995) is a Serbian professional footballer who plays as a defender for Kazakh clubTobol.

Club career
Born in Kosovska Mitrovica, Mlađović started playing football in local football club Trepča, where he also passed youth categories. He moved to Sloga Kraljevo in 2012, playing for two seasons with the club as a youngster. After he outgrew youth selection, Mlađović returned to his home club Trepča for the 2014–15 season, making his first senior appearances in the Morava Zone League, and Serbian Cup. For the next season, he moved to the Serbian League West side Mokra Gora, but after a half-season, he joined Teleoptik. Playing with Teleoptik, Mlađović collected 16 appearances in the Serbian League Belgrade at total between 2016 and 2017, for a promotion in the Serbian First League. In the summer of 2017 he left Teleoptik and signed with SuperLiga club Bačka. He made his professional debut for the new club against Spartak Subotica on 22 July 2017. On the last day of the summer transfer window 2017, Mlađović moved to the Serbian First League club Inđija.

Career statistics

Club

Honours
Teleoptik
Serbian League Belgrade: 2016–17

References

External links
 
 

1995 births
Living people
Sportspeople from Mitrovica, Kosovo
Association football defenders
Serbian footballers
FK Trepča players
FK Teleoptik players
OFK Bačka players
FK Inđija players
FK Metalac Gornji Milanovac players
Serbian First League players
Serbian SuperLiga players